Sha'arei Orah translates to "Gates of Light" in Hebrew and may refer to:

Sha'arei Orah – a book on Jewish mysticism by Rabbi Joseph ben Abraham Gikatilla (b. 1248 – d. after 1305)
Sha'arei Orah – a book on Chabad Hasidic philosophy by Rabbi Dovber Schneuri (1773 - 1827)
Sha'arei Orah – a book on Jewish ethics by Rabbi Avigdor Miller (1908 - 2001)